Ignatius van Logteren (1685 – 1732), was an 18th-century sculptor from the Northern Netherlands.

Biography
He was born in Amsterdam and was possibly the pupil of Francis van Bossuit, since his work was heavily influenced by him. He became the father of the sculptor Jan van Logteren, who assisted him in his workshop in statuary and stucco reliefs for the wealthy mansion owners of Amsterdam.
He died in Amsterdam.

Public collections
Among the public collections holding works by Ignatius van Logteren  are:
 Museum de Fundatie in Zwolle

References

Ignatius van Logteren on Artnet

1685 births
1732 deaths
18th-century Dutch sculptors
18th-century Dutch male artists
Dutch male sculptors
Artists from Amsterdam